The 2015 Cricket World Cup was the 11th Cricket World Cup, jointly hosted by Australia and New Zealand; India were the defending champions, having won the tournament in 2011. The 2015 Cricket World Cup Final took place at the Melbourne Cricket Ground, and was won by Australia, who defeated New Zealand by 7 wickets in the final.

The fourteen teams that competed at the 2015 World Cup were all required to submit a final 15-man squad to the ICC headquarters in Dubai on or before 7 January 2015, although the squads did not have to be publicly that date. In order to assist this process, many teams chose to name larger probable squads in November or December, with the understanding that the final squad would be picked from within these players. Changes to the squad were allowed after this deadline at the discretion of the ICC's Technical Committee in necessary cases, such as due to player injury, and so some teams also chose to name standby players alongside their 15-man squad.

Sri Lanka chose to name veteran players Mahela Jayawardene and Kumar Sangakkara in their squad- they were the two most experienced ODI players at the tournament, as Jayawardene has played over 400 ODIs for Sri Lanka, and Sangakkara played his 400th ODI during the tournament. Jayawardene was also the most experienced World Cup player at the tournament, with 33 previous appearances. UAE's Khurram Khan was the oldest player at the tournament, whilst fellow Emirati Mohammad Tauqir became the oldest ever World Cup captain; both players were 43 years old. Afghanistan's Usman Ghani was the youngest player at the tournament, at the age of 18.

Below is a list of the squads chosen for the 2015 Cricket World Cup.

Key

Group A

Afghanistan
Afghanistan named their 15-man squad on 29 December 2014. In addition to the 15-man squad presented, Afghanistan also named four standby players: Shafiqullah, Sharafuddin Ashraf, Izatullah Dawlatzai, Hashmatullah Shaidi.

Coach:  Andy Moles

1 On 25 February, Mirwais Ashraf was ruled out of the World Cup, and replaced by Shafiqullah.

Australia

Australia announced their 15-man squad publicly on 11 January 2015. Michael Clarke's selection was provisional on his fitness, but on 18 February, Clarke was declared fit to play against Bangladesh. As this match was abandoned without a ball being bowled, Clarke's first game of the World Cup was against co-hosts New Zealand on 28 February. George Bailey captained the side in their opening game against England, but was then dropped from the team when Clarke returned.

Coach:  Darren Lehmann

Bangladesh
Bangladesh announced their 15-member squad on 4 January 2015. The squad was initially scheduled to be announced at 1300 local time (UTC+06:00). However, it was delayed by two hours as a result of a last minute discussion between the selection committee, the board of directors of the BCB, and BCB President Nazmul Hassan. Two standby players were also announced, with Shafiul Islam, Abul Hasan named. After receiving a 40% match fee fine and a warning for slow over rate, captain Mashrafe Mortaza sat out of the last Group Stage match against New Zealand, to avoid being suspended for their quarter-final with India; Shakib Al Hasan captained the team for this match.

Coach: Chandika Hathurusingha

1 On 23 February, Al-Amin Hossain was sent home from the tournament after breaking a team curfew. He was replaced by Shafiul Islam.
2 On 6 March, the injured Anamul Haque was replaced by Imrul Kayes.

England
England were the first team to name their 15-man squad, doing so on 20 December 2014. The same 15-man squad was used for the Carlton Mid Triangular Series in Australia in 2014–15, and was captained by Eoin Morgan after Alastair Cook was sacked as ODI captain in December. Shortly before the World Cup, Jos Buttler was named as vice-captain for the tournament.

Coach: Peter Moores

New Zealand
New Zealand released their 15-man squad to the public on 8 January 2015. 
 
Coach: Mike Hesson

1 On 22 March, Adam Milne was ruled out of the World Cup with a heel injury. He was replaced by Matt Henry.

Scotland
Scotland released their 15-man squad to the public on 9 January 2015. They had previously released a 24-man provisional squad on 9 December 2014, which included all the players who went on their warm-up tour of Australia and New Zealand in September/October 2014.

Head coach: Grant Bradburn

1 On 11 March, Majid Haq was sent home after breaking the team's internal code of conduct.

Sri Lanka
Sri Lanka named their 15-man squad on 7 January 2015. Lasith Malinga's selection was provisional on his fitness, however he was passed fit prior to Sri Lanka's opening match, and played in every match. However, over the course of the tournament, five other players had to be withdrawn due to injury. Sri Lanka used 19 different players over the course of the World Cup, more than any other team; every squad player except Prasad made an appearance at the World Cup.

Coach: Marvan Atapattu

1 On 7 February, Prasad was ruled out of the World Cup, after fracturing his hand in training. He was replaced by Dushmantha Chameera on 9 February. 
2 On 25 February, Jeevan Mendis was ruled out of the World Cup with a hamstring injury. He was replaced by Upul Tharanga.
3 On 5 March, Dimuth Karunathne was ruled out of the World Cup with an injury to his little finger. He was replaced by Seekkuge Prasanna.
4 On 10 March, Dinesh Chandimal was ruled out of the World Cup with a hamstring injury. He was replaced by Kusal Perera.
5 On 17 March, Rangana Herath was ruled out of the World Cup with an injury to his spinning finger. He was replaced by Tharindu Kaushal.

Group B

India
India named their 15-man squad on 6 January 2015. Dhawal Kulkarni was picked as a standby injury cover for Bhuvneshwar Kumar, although he was not called up for the tournament. India used the same 11 players for every match except against the UAE, where Bhuvneshwar Kumar played instead of Mohammed Shami,
as a result, they used the fewest players (12) of any team in the tournament.

Coach: Duncan Fletcher

1 On 7 February, Ishant Sharma was ruled out of the World Cup, after failing to recover from a knee injury. He was replaced by Mohit Sharma.

Ireland
Ireland announced their 15-member squad on 5 January 2015. The squad was the same as for the Dubai Triangular Series 2014–15.

Coach: Phil Simmons

1 Max Sorensen replaced Tim Murtagh, who was originally selected before pulling out due to injury.

Pakistan
Pakistan named their 15-man squad on 7 January 2015.

Coach: Waqar Younis

1 On 2 February, Junaid Khan pulled out of the World Cup with a hamstring injury. On 6 February, the ICC approved Rahat Ali as a replacement for Junaid Khan.
2 On 8 February, Mohammad Hafeez was ruled out of the World Cup with a calf injury, and was replaced by Nasir Jamshed.

South Africa
South Africa named their squad on 7 January 2015.

Coach: Russell Domingo

United Arab Emirates
United Arab Emirates (UAE) released their 15-man squad on 10 January 2015. On the same day, Mohammad Tauqir was named as captain, replacing Khurram Khan, making Tauqir the oldest World Cup captain. Khan was vice-captain for this tournament.

Coach: Aaqib Javed

West Indies
West Indies announced their 15-man squad on 11 January 2015. Ex-captains Dwayne Bravo and Kieron Pollard were not included in the squad, having been dropped from the team before the South Africa series, Darren Sammy, who also missed that series, was included in the World Cup squad. Marlon Samuels was appointed as the vice-captain for the tournament.

Manager: Richie Richardson

1 Narine withdrew from the squad on 27 January, citing confidence problems with his new bowling action. On 29 January, Nikita Miller was named as a replacement.
2 Darren Bravo was ruled out with a hamstring injury on 27 February. He was replaced by Johnson Charles.

Zimbabwe
Zimbabwe named their 15-man squad on 7 January 2015; they had previously named a 30-man provisional squad. Captain Elton Chigumbura did not play the last 2 games due to a muscle tear; Brendan Taylor captained the team for these matches.

Coach: Dav Whatmore

Statistics

ODI caps

Age

Notes

References

External links
Provisional squad lists
List of final squads

Cricket World Cup squads